Eschette is a village in the commune of Rambrouch and the canton of Redange in western Luxembourg. As of 2008, it has 38 inhabitants.

The remains of Schorels Castle, an old fort, are located near Eschette.

References

External links

Rambrouch
Villages in Luxembourg